Georgina Josefa del Carmen Febres Cordero-Troconis, also known as Mother Georgina (16 November 1861 – 28 June 1925) was a Venezuelan nun.

Biography 
After the death of her mother on October 1873, Georgina took charge of the Clarisas Sisters congregation along with her aunt Sofía Febres Cordero, sister of her father. Back then, they were the only religious congregation in Mérida. After the execution of the Extinction of the Convents of Female Religious  Life Decree on 5 May 1874, during the presidency of Antonio Guzmán Blanco, the Clarisas Sisters congregation were ordered to close and their members to return to their homes. She founded the Dominican Sisters of Santa Rosa de Lima on 5 July 1900, and was the director and administrator of the Hospicio San Juan de Dios accompanied by Julia Picón and Herminia Vitoria under the protection of bishop Antonio Ramón Silva. In the Latin American Santoral, her celebration day is June 28.

Eighty years after her death, on 28 June 2005, Febres Cordero's beatification process started in Mérida.

See also 
Catholic Church in Venezuela

References 

1861 births
1925 deaths
People from Mérida, Mérida
20th-century Venezuelan Roman Catholic nuns
Founders of Catholic religious communities
19th-century Venezuelan Roman Catholic nuns